Search is the debut album by Cleveland-based indie rock band Herzog, originally released on July 2, 2010 on Transparent Records. It would later be re-released by Exit Stencil Recordings on February 8, 2011.

Track listing
Silence
West Blvd.
Static Shock
Town to Town
Living Alone
Paul Blart and the Death of Art
Abandon Love
Moving Away
Steady Hands
Cautiously Optimistic
Slowest Romance

References

Herzog (band) albums
2010 debut albums